James Angel (12 January 1838 – 23 October 1918) was an important consumer manufacturer of metal products in Newfoundland. He was also a member of the Legislative Council and a supporter of Premier Sir William Vallance Whiteway.

Biography 
James Angel was born in Halifax on 12 January 1838. He ran a machine shop with his father, before founding the St. John's Iron Foundry in 1867.

He died at his home in St. John's on 23 October 1918.

References 

 

1838 births
1918 deaths
Businesspeople from Nova Scotia